Donald Reed (born Ernesto Avila Guillen; July 23, 1901 – February 28, 1973) was a Mexican film actor, and later, Beverly Hills video consultant. He appeared in more than 40 films between 1925 and 1940.

Biography
Reed was born in Mexico City as Ernesto Avila Guillen, the son of Alberto Guillen, a shoe merchant. His name was changed to Ernest Gillen when he signed with Universal. When he later signed with First National, his name was changed to Donald Reed.

He married the beauty pageant winner Janet Eastman and the two had one daughter together, Joy. He was born in Mexico City, Mexico and died in Westwood, Los Angeles, California.

Selected filmography

 Any Woman (1925) - Tom Galloway
 His Secretary (1925) - Head Clerk
 The Auction Block (1926) - Carter Lane
 Brown of Harvard (1926) - Reggie Smythe
 Convoy (1927) - Smith's assistant
 Naughty but Nice (1927) - Paul Carroll
 Mad Hour (1928) - Jack Hemingway Jr
 Mark of the Frog (1928)
 Night Watch (1928) - Lieutenant D'Artelle
 Show Girl (1928) - Alvarez Romano
 A Real Girl (1929) - Kyle Stannard
 Evangeline (1929) - Baptiste
 A Most Immoral Lady (1929) - Pedro the Gigolo
 Little Johnny Jones (1929) - Ramon
 Le spectre vert (1930) - Major Mallory
 The Texan (1930) - Nick Ibarra
 Men Without Law (1930) - Ramon del Rey
 Are You There? (1930) - Young Man
 Playthings of Hollywood (1930) - Barry Gaynor
 Aloha (1931) - Kahea
 Hollywood, City of Dreams (1931)
 Santa (1932) - Marcelino
 Soul of Mexico (1932)
 The Racing Strain (1932) - Rival Car Driver
 The Man from Monterey (1933) - Don Luis Gonzales
 The Wolf Dog (1933) - Swanson
 Uncertain Lady (1934) - Carlos Almirante
 Happy Landing (1934) - Paul
 Six Gun Justice (1935) - Marshal Jack McDonald
 The Cyclone Ranger (1935) - Juan Castalar
 The Devil Is a Woman (1935) - 'Cousin' Miguelito (uncredited)
 The Vanishing Riders (1935) - Frank Stanley
 The Fighting Marines (1935, Serial) - Pedro - Henchman
 Darkest Africa (1936, Serial) - Negus [Chs. 11-12]
 Special Agent K-7 (1936) - Billy Westrop
 One Rainy Afternoon (1936) - Minor Role (uncredited)
 Ramona (1936) - Vaquero (uncredited)
 Law and Lead (1936) - Pancho Gonzales, aka The Juarez Kid
 Under Strange Flags (1937) - Garcia
 The Last Train from Madrid (1937) - Husband (uncredited)
 Slaves in Bondage (1937) - Phillip Miller
 The Legion of Missing Men (1937) - Arab (uncredited)
 The Firefly (1937) - French Officer (uncredited)
 Renfrew of the Royal Mounted (1937) - Constable MacDonald
 Juvenile Court (1938) - Reporter (uncredited)
 Midnight (1939) - Ferdinand - Eve's Chauffeur (uncredited)
 Mad Youth (1939) - Club Emcee (uncredited) (final film role)

References

External links

1901 births
1973 deaths
Male actors from New Mexico
American male film actors
American male silent film actors
Mexican emigrants to the United States
20th-century American male actors